Scarborough Village is a neighbourhood in Toronto, Ontario, Canada, located in the Scarborough district. It was one of the earliest settlements in the former township of Scarborough with the distinction of being the site of the township's first post office. Today, the neighbourhood is composed of private and public housing, apartment complexes, schools, a few condominiums, and strip mall plazas. The neighbourhood lies along the Scarborough Bluffs escarpment.

History
Scarborough Village established as a settlement in the 1800s by Cornell and Secor as a crossroads village. It was centered on Markham Road between Kingston Road to the south and Eglinton Avenue to the north. The area provided settlers with access to the lakeshore and partially served as a through-way for
soldiers during the War of 1812. In 1832, it became the first community in the former Township of Scarborough to have its own post office. By 1856, Scarborough Village became a subdivision and by 1860, the area of Scarborough Village had its first completed brick schoolhouse. By the 1890s, a general store, a blacksmith shop, a store that sold farm accessories, and a large railway hotel were built in the area. The area only contained about a dozen dwellings. 

During the 1930s, Kingston Road had become a major route connecting Old Toronto with the rest of eastern Ontario communities, as well as Montreal. After the construction of the Grand Trunk Railway tracks north of Eglinton Avenue, Kingston Road had decreased in traffic and few businesses began to close.

Demographics 
According to the 2006 Canadian Census (0331.01 census tract) approximately 80% of the population is first generation Canadian. Meaning that 80% of the population was born outside of Canada compared to the 9% who are second generation and 11% who are third generation. Second generation refers to persons who were born in Canada, but have at least one parent who was born outside of Canada, and third generation refers to persons who were born in Canada with both parents born in Canada.

However, in the 2011 National Household Survey the number of first generation Canadian's shrunk to 68%, while the second generation percentage increased to 26%. Additionally, the percentage of third generation Canadian's decreased to 6%. The average income among individual incomes between 2006 and 2011 has increased by 10.95% (Statistics Canada, 2011). However, individuals under the $10,000 and $19,999 category showed a dropped significantly in income levels in 2011, 185 individual are making less money under this category (Statistics Canada, 2011).. The most significant increase occurs in the 20,000 to 29,999 category, which reveals an increase of 300 individuals (Statistics Canada, 2011).

Education

Two public school boards operate elementary schools in the area, the separate Toronto Catholic District School Board (TCDSB), and the secular Toronto District School Board (TDSB). Public elementary schools in Scarborough village include:

 Cedar Drive Public School
 George P. Mackie Junior Public School
 Mason Road Junior Public School
 Scarborough Village Public School (Formerly School Section no. 9)
 St. Boniface Catholic School

Neither TCDSB, or TDSB operate a secondary school in the neighbourhood, with TCDSB/TDSB students residing in Scarborough Village attending secondary schools in adjacent areas. The French-based public secular school board, Conseil scolaire Viamonde, and it separate counterpart, Conseil scolaire catholique MonAvenir also offer schooling to applicable residents of Scarborough Village, although they do not operate a school in the neighbourhood, with CSCM/CSV students attending schools situated in other neighbourhoods in Toronto.

Transportation

The neighbourhood is served by Toronto Transit Commission bus routes 86 Scarborough, 116 Morningside, 905 Eglinton East Express, and 986 Scarborough Express, which connect to Kennedy station, a station for the Toronto subway. Other routes, 102 Markham and 9 Bellamy, connect to Warden station to the south while the latter route connects to the Scarborough Centre station to the north.

Located at the northwestern boundary of Scarborough Village, on Eglinton Avenue is Eglinton GO Station. The station provides access to GO Transit's commuter rail lines to Downtown Toronto, as well as other destinations along its line.

Its southern border, Kingston Road, is a major roadway providing access to south-western Scarborough, East York, Old Toronto and Downtown Toronto in the west and extends to Durham Region in the east.

Notable places
Markington Square — largest plaza in Scarborough Village
Christ Church of Scarborough Village — oldest church in Scarborough Village (though rebuilt several times)
Scarborough Village Community Centre — a branch of the Toronto Parks, Forestry and Recreation Division
Scarborough Village Theatre — part of the Scarborough Village Community Centre and home to Scarborough music theatre, Scarborough Players, and Scarborough Theatre Guild

Notable people
Robert McCowan, for whom McCowan Road is named
Alexander Muir, the author of the song "The Maple Leaf Forever"
Conn Smythe, former Toronto Maple Leafs owner, pupil of Scarborough Village P.S.

References

Neighbourhoods in Toronto
Scarborough, Toronto